Velamysta peninna is a species of butterfly of the family Nymphalidae. It is found in Bolivia and Peru.

Subspecies
Velamysta peninna peninna (Bolivia)
Velamysta peninna new subspecies (Peru)

References

Butterflies described in 1855
Ithomiini
Nymphalidae of South America